The 2014 Virginia Tech Hokies football team represented the Virginia Tech in the 2014 NCAA Division I FBS football season. The Hokies were led by 28th-year head coach Frank Beamer and played their home games at Lane Stadium in Blacksburg, Virginia. They were members of the Coastal Division of the Atlantic Coast Conference. They finished the season 7–6, 3–5 in ACC play to finish in a three way tie for fifth place in the Coastal Division. They were invited to the Military Bowl where they defeated Cincinnati. They were also the only team to beat the eventual National Champions, The Ohio State Buckeyes.

Personnel

Coaching staff

Schedule

Schedule Source:

Game summaries

William & Mary

Ohio State

East Carolina

Georgia Tech

Western Michigan

North Carolina

Pittsburgh

Miami (FL)

Boston College

Duke

Wake Forest

Virginia

Cincinnati

Rankings

References

Virginia Tech
Virginia Tech Hokies football seasons
Military Bowl champion seasons
Virginia Tech Hokies football